Throughout history, especially in prehistoric and early history, castles have played an important role in the fortification of Iran. They were usually maintained by officials on important routes or cities, and most of them were in unmarked heights with steep slopes or cliffs. Such places have always served as a natural defenses against enemies and offer a panoramic view of the surrounding lands, so cities and surrounding lands can be defended. Most of Iran's castles had spring or Wells, except for those that were previously surrounded by water.

Important castles

List of castles in Iran 
This is a list of castles in Iran.

A

B

C

D

E

F

G

H

I

J

K

L

M

N

O

P

Q

R

S

T

V

Y

Z

See also
List of castles

References 

Iran
Iran
Castles
Iran
Castles